Michal Svajlen (born 12 April 1989) is a Swiss handball player for Pfadi Winterthur and the Swiss national team.

He represented Switzerland at the 2020 European Men's Handball Championship.

References

External links

1989 births
Living people
Swiss male handball players
Sportspeople from Zürich